Kompóti is a village and a former municipality in the Arta regional unit, Epirus, Greece. Since the 2011 local government reform it is part of the municipality Nikolaos Skoufas, of which it is a municipal unit. The municipal unit has an area of 38.486 km2. In 2011 its population was 1,544 for the town, 11650 for the community and 2,542 for the municipal unit. The Greek National Road 5/E55 connects Kompoti with Messolonghi to the south and Arta and Ioannina to the north.  Kompoti is located north of Amfilochia and Agrinio, east-northeast of Preveza and southeast of Arta.  The Ambracian Gulf is to the south. Kompoti became part of Greece in 1881.

Subdivisions
The municipal unit Kompoti is subdivided into the following communities (constituent villages in brackets):
Kompoti (Kompoti, Agios Nikolaos)
Foteino
Sellades (Sellades, Alonia)

Population

Other
Kompoti has a few schools, a lyceum (middle school), a gymnasium (secondary school) a few churches, banks, a post office, and a square.

Kompoti is the birthplace of Nikolaos Skoufas, one of the founders of Filiki Eteria meaning Society of Friends in Greek, which was a secret organization working in the early 19th century, whose purpose was to overthrow Ottoman rule over Greece and to establish an independent Greek state.

References

External links

http://www.kompoti.gr
Kompoti (municipality) on GTP Travel Pages
Kompoti (village) on GTP Travel Pages

Populated places in Arta (regional unit)